Bogorodica is a village located in the Gevgelija Municipality of North Macedonia.

Demographics
According to the 2002 census, the village had a total of 1001 inhabitants. Ethnic groups in the village include:

Macedonians 975
Serbs 18
Aromanians 7
Others 1

References

Villages in Gevgelija Municipality